Holly Coulis (born 1968) is a Canadian painter from Toronto,  the co-founder of "Gallery 106 Green" based in Athens, Georgia and Brooklyn, New York.

Education
Holly Coulis earned a Bachelor of Fine Arts degree from the Ontario College of Art and Design, Toronto, Ontario, and a Master of Fine Arts degree from the School of the Museum of Fine Arts, Boston, Massachusetts.

Selected exhibition
 Eyes and Yous (2022), Klaus von Nichtssagend, New York, NY
 Orbit (2021), Philip Martin Gallery, Los Angeles, California
 Holly Coulis (2019), Klaus von Nichtssagend, New York, NY
 Dishes and Fruits (2019), Atlanta Contemporary, Atlanta, GA
 Holly Coulis (2015), Cherry and Martin, Los Angeles, California

References

External links 
 Gallery 106 Green

Canadian painters
Artists from Toronto
Artists from Brooklyn
OCAD University alumni
School of the Museum of Fine Arts at Tufts alumni
1968 births
Living people